Springfield Warehouse and Industrial Historic District is a national historic district located in Springfield, Missouri, United States. It encompasses 16 contributing buildings and 1 contributing structure in a commercial / industrial section of Springfield. Developed between about 1891 and 1948, the district also includes representative examples of Italianate and Romanesque Revival style architecture. Notable buildings include the Springfield Ice and Refrigerator Company (1914, 1927), Armour Creamery Boiler House (c. 1900), Andrew Rebori Company (c. 1900), Crighton Provision Company (c. 1900), and Armour Creamery Cold Storage Warehouse (c. 1910).

It was added to the National Register of Historic Places in 1999.

References

Historic districts on the National Register of Historic Places in Missouri
Italianate architecture in Missouri
Romanesque Revival architecture in Missouri
Buildings and structures in Springfield, Missouri
National Register of Historic Places in Greene County, Missouri